David Tahnya Wirikom (June 28, 1990) is a Cameroonian footballer who last played for Gandzasar Kapan in the Armenian Premier League.

Career

Club
Wirikom joined Iran Pro League side Saba Qom on loan in 2012 after spending the previous years at Shirin Faraz and Nassaji in Azadegan League. In summer of 2013 Wirikom signed a two-year contract with Rah Ahan. After only one season at the club Wirikom joined cross town rivals Naft Tehran.

International
In 2011, Wirikom received his first cap for the Cameroon national under-23 football team. He made five appearances with the team and scoring once.

Club statistics

References

External sources
 Profile at Persianleague.com

1990 births
Living people
Cameroonian footballers
Les Astres players
Cameroonian expatriate footballers
Shirin Faraz Kermanshah players
Nassaji Mazandaran players
Saba players
Rah Ahan players
Naft Tehran F.C. players
Armenian Premier League players
Persian Gulf Pro League players
Expatriate footballers in Iran
Expatriate footballers in Armenia
Cameroonian expatriate sportspeople in Iran
Cameroonian expatriate sportspeople in Armenia
Association football midfielders